The Valspar Championship is a professional golf tournament on the PGA Tour, played annually on the Copperhead Course at Innisbrook Resort and Golf Club in Palm Harbor, northwest of Tampa, Florida.

History
The tournament was founded in 2000 as the Tampa Bay Classic, and was originally an alternate event in autumn and late summer. It was opposite the Presidents Cup in October 2000, and the same week as the WGC-American Express Championship in September 2002. It was scheduled for the same week as the WGC-American Express Championship in 2001 in mid-September, but the September 11 attacks (on Tuesday) forced the cancellations of both tournaments.

From 2003 to 2006, the Tampa Bay event had a slot in the schedule to itself in late October (and early November in 2003) as the last full-field event before the Tour Championship. The Chrysler Corporation was the title sponsor.

Since 2007, the Tampa Bay event has been played in March, as the Players Championship moved six weeks later, to mid-May. For a time, the tournament was without a title sponsor, leading to speculation on its fate beyond 2007. Then, on January 24, 2007, tournament officials and the PGA Tour announced a six-year sponsorship agreement with PODS of Clearwater, Florida. However, the company chose to exercise an option to withdraw as title sponsor after the 2008 event, and tournament officials searched to find a replacement. On June 4, 2008, Transitions Optical, Inc., the photochromic lens manufacturer headquartered locally in Largo, was announced as the new title sponsor.  Transitions left the event after the 2012 season. Just two weeks before the 2013 tournament, EverBank agreed to be presenting sponsor for the tournament. In September 2013, Valspar Corporation signed a four-year deal to become title sponsor of the event, now named the Valspar Championship. On March 9, 2016, the PGA Tour, Valspar Corporation, and Copperhead Charities – the Valspar Championship host organization – announced a three-year title sponsorship extension, thus carrying Valspar's commitment to the tournament through 2020. This extension occurred in the midst of the original contract period, which was from 2013 to 2017.

Vijay Singh set the tournament record in 2004 with 266 (−18) and won by five strokes.

Winners

Note: Green highlight indicates scoring records.

Multiple winners
Four players have won this tournament more than once: 
K. J. Choi (2002, 2006)
Retief Goosen (2003, 2009)
Paul Casey (2018, 2019)
Sam Burns (2021, 2022)

References

External links

Coverage on PGA Tour's official site

PGA Tour events
Golf in Florida
Sports competitions in Florida
Sports in Pinellas County, Florida
Recurring sporting events established in 2000
2000 establishments in Florida